Rob Banks (born February 3, 1930) is an American pianist, organist and composer. The artists he has worked with include Solomon Burke and Lu Elliott.

Background
Banks was discovered by Horace Sims, a guitarist who took him on the road with his band El Tempo.

Career

1950s
In 1954, his recording of "Mambo Blues" appeared on the B side of a Johnny Otis Orchestra single "Mambo Boogie". It was released on the Savoy label.
In 1956, the Robert Banks Trio did a cover of the Glenn Miller theme, "Moonlight Serenade", released on the Regent label.
In October 1957, banks and Hal Rollins recorded some tracks for Newark's Glowhill label. The single that Banks recorded was "On The Street Where You Live" which was backed with "Destination", a frenzied type of instrumental.

1960s
During the 1960s, he worked with Solomon Burke. He also arranged and conducted both sides of the Willie Hightower single For "Sentimental Reasons" / "You Send Me", released on Capitol.

1970s
He produced the Myrna Summers & The Interdenominational Singers Tell It Like It Is album that was released by 1970.

1980s
In 1981, he was part of a duo consisting of himself on piano and bassist Jimmy Lewis, backing singer Lu Elliott at The Cookery at East Eighth Street at University Place in New York.

Rob Banks discography

Singles
 "Moonlight Serenade" / "Sentimental Journey" - Regent 7501 - (1956)
 "Smile" / "A Mighty Good Way" - Verve VK-10545 - (1967)

Albums
Record LP
 The Message - Verve V-5016 - (1967)
8-Track Cartridge 
 Rob Banks - Theme from the Godfather - Altone 1973
 Rob Banks, Soulmate Singers - Theme from Isaac Hayes' Shaft (Shaft/Jesus Christ Superstar) - Altone 1974

Other discography
With Mildred Anderson
No More in Life (Bluesville, 1961)
With the Johnny Otis Orchestra featuring Goucho and His Jungle Drums
"Mambo Boogie" / Rob Banks And The Waileros - "Mambo Blues" - Savoy 45-1132 - (1954)
With Shakey Jake
Mouth Harp Blues (Bluesville, 1961)
With Curtis Jones
Trouble Blues (Bluesville, 1960)
With Sunnyland Slim
 Slim's Shout (Bluesville, 1961)
With Al Smith
Midnight Special (Bluesville, 1961)
With Roosevelt Sykes
 The Honeydripper (Bluesville, 1961)

References

Living people
1930 births
American male organists
20th-century American composers
20th-century American pianists
American male pianists
American male composers
21st-century American pianists
21st-century organists
20th-century American male musicians
21st-century American male musicians
American organists